The Ambitious Servant Girl is a 1962 TV play broadcast by the Australian Broadcasting Corporation. It was an opera and was directed by Christopher Muir. Australian TV drama was relatively rare at the time.

It stars June Bronhill is 40 minutes long. It was shot in Melbourne.

References

1960s Australian television plays
Australian television plays based on operas
Australian Broadcasting Corporation original programming
English-language television shows
1962 television plays
1960s English-language films